James Hazlett may refer to:

James M. Hazlett (1864–1941), Republican member of the U.S. House of Representatives from Pennsylvania
Jim Hazlett (1926–2010), college baseball and football head coach

See also
Jim Haslett (born 1955), NFL coach and former player